James Henry Martin (183521 November 1909) was a British shipowner and entrepreneur. He founded Killick Martin & Company with James Killick.

Biography

Early life
James Henry Martin was born in Middlesex during 1835.

His farther James Martin and was born in Gillingham, Kent during 1799 and during the 1870s and 1880s was Joint Principle Surveyor of Lloyds Register.

Prior to 1861 James Henry Martin worked for Phillips, Shaw & Lowther, owners of the clipper ships like Ariel and Titania. During his period with the partnership James Henry Martin concentrated on the running of the office and securing of cargo. In 1885 the changed its name to Shaw, Lowther and Maxton, when Peter Maxton, former Captain joined the partnership. Incidentally Maxton was friends with Captain James Killick and captained two ships, 'The Lord of the Isles' and 'Falcon' the same periods Captain Killick was master of ‘Challenger’ in the tea trade from China.

Killick Martin, Killick Martin & Company 
On 1 March 1861 James Henry Martin along with Captain James Killick founded the partnership Kilick Martin. The original 'Notice of Opening a Partnership' stated that it commenced business as ‘Ship and Insurance Brokers’.
The company went on to be known as Killick Martin & Company from 2 March 1862 when David William Richie became a partner. David William Ritchie's father was the Joint Principle Surveyor, Joseph Horatio Ritchie alongside James Martin, so it seems the two partners in Killick Martin & Company originally would have become aquatinted via their fathers.

Killick Martin & Company went on to own and operate twenty ships between 1862 and 1879. These included the likes of Challenger, Wylo, Lothair and Kaisow.

The company has continuously evolved, still exists and continues to trade today.

James Henry Martin married Louisa Barber Smith on 10 June 1871 in St. Mary's Church Lewisham and went on to have three children: James Henry Martin 1874, Alfred Scott Martin 1876 and Louisa M Martin 1884.

James Henry Martin retired from the business during the mid-1880s due to a breakdown; Walter Johnson had the task of taking him to a mental home in Scotland.

Whilst the extent of James Henry Martin's illness is unknown he is listed in the 1891 English census living with his children in Lewisham, London. His wife died on 5 June 1894.

James Henry Martin died on 21 November 1909 in Hastings, Sussex.

Legacy

Killick Martin's House Flag is held within the National Maritime Museum, and a Builder's model of Lothair in the Hong Kong Museum of History.

References

Further reading
The China Clippers by Basil Lubbock 1914.
The Tea Clippers 1833-1875 by David MacGregor (1983 enlarged and revised) 
Clipper Ships by David MacGregor (1979)

External links
Killick Martin & Company owned ships 
Killick Martin & Company

19th-century British businesspeople
1835 births
1909 deaths
British businesspeople in shipping